MOJO Presents Pet Sounds Revisited is a multi-artist tribute album compiled by the monthly journal MOJO, released for their 223rd issue in June 2012. It comprises various alternative British musicians cover versions of tracks from the Beach Boys' album Pet Sounds (1966) in commemoration of the group's 50th anniversary.

Track listing

See also
List of cover versions of Beach Boys songs

References

The Beach Boys tribute albums
2012 compilation albums
Alternative rock compilation albums
Compilation albums by British artists